A partial lunar eclipse took place on 7 September 2006, the second of two lunar eclipses in 2006. The tables below contain detailed predictions and additional information on the Partial Lunar Eclipse of 7 September 2006.

Eclipse Season 

This is the first eclipse this season.

Second eclipse this season: 22 September 2006 Annular Solar Eclipse

Visibility 

It was completely visible over most of Africa, Europe, Asia and Australia.

A simulated view of the earth from the center of the moon at maximum eclipse.

Map

Photos
Degania A, Israel

Relation to other lunar eclipses

Eclipses of 2006 
 A penumbral lunar eclipse on 14 March.
 A total solar eclipse on 29 March.
 A partial lunar eclipse on 7 September.
 An annular solar eclipse on 22 September.

Metonic cycle (19 years) 

This eclipse is the first of four Metonic cycle lunar eclipses on the same date, 7 September, each separated by 19 years:

Half-Saros cycle
A lunar eclipse will be preceded and followed by solar eclipses by 9 years and 5.5 days (a half saros). This lunar eclipse is related to two partial solar eclipses of Solar Saros 125.

Tritos series 
 Preceded: Lunar eclipse of October 8, 1995
 Followed: Lunar eclipse of August 7, 2017

Tzolkinex 
 Preceded: Lunar eclipse of July 28, 1999
 Followed: Lunar eclipse of October 18, 2013

See also 
List of lunar eclipses and List of 21st-century lunar eclipses
May 2003 lunar eclipse
November 2003 lunar eclipse
May 2004 lunar eclipse
 :File:2006-09-07 Lunar Eclipse Sketch.gif Chart

References

External links
 
 Hermit eclipse: 2006-09-07
 Photo
 photo from New Zealand 

2006-09
2006 in science
September 2006 events